A mirepoix is a mixture of diced vegetables cooked with fat (usually butter) for a long time on low heat without coloring or browning. The ingredients are not sautéed or otherwise hard-cooked, because the intention is to sweeten rather than caramelize them. Mirepoix is a long-standing part of French cuisine and is the flavor base for a wide variety of dishes, including stocks, soups, stews, and sauces.

When the mirepoix is not precooked, the constituent vegetables may be cut to a larger size, depending on the overall cooking time for the dish. Usually the vegetable mixture is onions, carrots, and celery (either common 'pascal' celery or celeriac), with the traditional ratio being 2:1:1—two parts onion, one part carrot, and one part celery. Further cooking, with the addition of tomato purée, creates a darkened brown mixture called .

History
Though the cooking technique is probably older, the word mirepoix dates from the 18th century and derives, as do many other appellations in French cuisine, from the aristocratic employer of the cook credited with establishing and stabilizing it: in this case, Charles-Pierre-Gaston François de Lévis, duc de Lévis-Mirepoix (1699–1757), French field marshal and ambassador and a member of the noble family of Lévis, lords of Mirepoix in Languedoc (nowadays in the department of Ariège) since the 11th century.  According to Pierre Larousse (quoted in The Oxford Companion to Food), the unfortunate Duke of Mirepoix was "an incompetent and mediocre individual ... who owed his vast fortune to the affection Louis XV felt toward his wife and who had but one claim to fame: he gave his name to a sauce made of all kinds of meat and a variety of seasonings".

The term is not encountered regularly in French culinary texts until the 19th century, so it is difficult to know what a dish  was like in 18th-century France. Marie-Antoine Carême, in 1816, gives a similar recipe, calling it simply "Mire-poix". By the mid-19th century, Jules Gouffé refers to mirepoix as "a term in use for such a long time that I do not hesitate to use it here". His mirepoix is listed among essences and, indeed, is a meaty concoction (laced with two bottles of Madeira), which, like all other essences, was used to enrich many a classic sauce. By the end of the 19th century, the mirepoix had taken on its modern meaning. Joseph Favre, in his Dictionnaire universel de cuisine (reprinted 1978), uses the term to describe a mixture of ham, carrots, onions, and herbs used as an aromatic condiment when making sauces or braising meat.

A  contains diced ham or pork belly as an additional ingredient. Similar combinations, both in and out of the French culinary repertoire, may include leeks, parsnips, garlic, tomatoes, shallots, mushrooms, bell peppers, chilies, and ginger, according to the requirements of the regional cuisine or the instructions of the particular chef or recipe. The analogous  (frequently containing parsley) is the basis for many traditional dishes in classic Italian cuisine, and the  serves a similar purpose in Spanish cuisines. In Cajun and Creole cuisine, a mirepoix or (jocularly so-called) "holy trinity" is a combination of onions, celery, and bell peppers.

Traditionally, the weight ratio for mirepoix is 2:1:1 of onions, celery, and carrots; the ratio for bones to mirepoix for stock is 10:1.

International versions

German 
Soup greens usually come in a bundle and consists of a leek, a carrot, and a piece of celeriac. It may also contain parsley, thyme, celery leaves, rutabaga (swede), parsley root, and onions. The mix depends on regional traditions, as well as individual recipes. The vegetables used are cold-climate roots and bulbs with long shelf lives.  act as herbs and impart hearty, strong flavors to the soup or sauce, providing a foil for other strong tasting ingredients such as dried peas and beans or pot roast. Large chunks of vegetables are slow cooked to make flavorful soups and stocks, and are discarded when the vegetables have given up most of their flavor. Finely chopped   are browned in fat and used as a basis for a finished sauce. The vegetables may also be cooked long enough until they fall apart, and may become part of the sauce or pureed to form the sauce.

Italian 

For this reason, it is a fundamental component in Italian cuisine. It may also contain garlic, shallot, or leek.

According to the Italian restaurateur Benedetta Vitali,  means 'underfried' and describes it as "a preparation of lightly browned minced vegetables, not a dish by itself." At one time it was called "false ragout", because  was thought to vaguely recall the flavor of meat sauce.

Polish 

  is the Polish word for soup vegetables or greens. The word literally means "Italian stuff" because Queen Bona Sforza, who was Italian and married Polish King Sigismund I the Old in 1518, introduced this concept to Polish cuisine. A  may consist of carrots, parsnips or parsley root, celery root or celeriac, leeks, and savoy or white cabbage leaves, and sometimes celery leaves and flat-leaf parsley. The most typical, packaged combination is celery root, parsley root, carrots, and leeks.  is usually cut up to uniform size and boiled to form a flavor base for soups and stews.

See also

Epis

References

External links

'Mirepoix', entry in The Food Timeline

Food ingredients
French cuisine
Culinary terminology
Celery
Carrot dishes
Onion-based foods